Jonathon Dutton (born 13 August 1981) is an Australian actor and director. From 1998 to 2002, Dutton played Tad Reeves in Neighbours. He later returned to the show as a director. Dutton has also appeared in MDA, Two Pints of Lager and a Packet of Crisps and Packed to the Rafters.

Career
Dutton was born in Geelong.  He had a small part in the Australian soap opera Neighbours, before going on to secure the regular role of Tad Reeves. He also made appearances in Thunderstone and Blue Heelers.

In 2003, Dutton played Brett Ferris in an episode of MDA. That same year he began appearing as David Fish in the British comedy series Two Pints of Lager and a Packet of Crisps. Dutton also portrayed Jeff in Australian drama series The Secret Life of Us. In 2006, the actor portrayed an ambulance driver in All Saints.

2009 saw Dutton make an appearance in Packed to the Rafters as Simon. From 2010, Dutton began directing episodes of Neighbours. In 2012, he received a nomination for Best Direction in a TV Drama Serial from the Australian Directors Guild Awards for his work on Episode 6188.

In 2019, Dutton directed the Neighbours spin-off series Neighbours: Erinsborough High.

Personal life
Dutton is married to actress Eve Morey. Their first child, a daughter, was born in November 2014.

Filmography

References

External links

1981 births
Living people
Male actors from Geelong
Australian male soap opera actors
Australian television directors